The 2014 Carling Black Label Cup was the fourth edition of the competition to be held.

A South African beer brand Black Label started the “Be The Coach” where the fans had the opportunity to elect the starting 11 of their desired players from the two Soweto derby arch rivals, Orlando Pirates, and Kaizer Chiefs which are two of the most successful and largest soccer clubs in South Africa. Fans had the chance to vote for their starting line-up by purchasing a Black Label beer and dialling *120*764* on their mobile phones or voting on the official website. They could then enter their unique code under of the bottle cap or beer can ring and the # sign, and then are able to choose their team they would like to manage on the day and the players they would like to see start in the starting lineup.

The selected teams played the match on 26 July 2014 at the FNB Stadium in Johannesburg.

About
The Black Label Cup tournament has replaced the Telkom Charity Cup. [Carling Black Labellaunched the campaign where the fans get to select the starting 11 players to take part in this once off Soweto Derby between Orlando Pirates and Kaizer Chiefs on Saturday 26 July 2014. Fans had from June 2014 till 26 July 2014 to select their top 15 player via their mobile phones. Carling Black Labelhas also announced that fans would select their own substitutions on the day of the game. During the first 45min, fans can send the shirt number of the player that they want to substitute via a text message. At 60min in the second half the player with the most votes will be substituted.

Be The Champion Coach
The Carling Black Label also put in place an initiative where for two lucky fans have the once-in-a-lifetime opportunity to coach their club on the matchday. One fan represents Kaizer Chiefs, the other, Orlando Pirates. The 'Consumer Coaches' will be randomly selected to be coaches of their respective teams get to present at their team's training sessions, pre-match briefings and be part of the dugout with their favourite team.

Requirements
To be eligible to be a consumer coach the fan should've voted either via their cellphone or at www.carlingblacklabel.co.za, a minimum of 11 times.

Consumer Coaches
 Tebogo Molekoa (Kaizer Chiefs).
 Cornelius Motsepe from Mmakau.

Venue
The FNB Stadium was chosen to host this once a year event. The FNB Stadium, known as Soccer City during the 2010 FIFA World Cup, is a stadium located in Nasrec, the Soweto area of Johannesburg, South Africa. It is located next to the South African Football Association headquarters (SAFA House) where both the FIFA offices and the Local Organising Committee for the 2010 FIFA World Cup were housed. Designed as the main association football stadium for the World Cup, the FNB Stadium became the largest stadium in Africa with a capacity of 94,700, However its maximum capacity during the 2010 FIFA World Cup was 84,490 due to reserved seating for the press and other VIP's. The stadium is also known by its nickname "The Calabash" due to its resemblance to the African pot or gourd.

Prize money

Starting XI announcement
The starting teams were announced before the game.

Match

Details

Unavailable players
Matthew Rusike, undergoing injury scans after getting injured the day before the match.
Siphiwe Tshabalala, picked up an injury in a friendly against Chippa United on 20 July 2014 and was ruled out for 10–14 days.
Knowledge Musona, listed as an ineligible player as he is still contracted to TSG Hoffenheim despite getting the second highest number of votes with 913,068.
Bernard Parker, undergoing knee surgery

References

Soccer cup competitions in South Africa
Carling